Vadakste is a river in the southern Latvia and northern Lithuania. It is a right tributary of the Venta River. It originates near the city Auce, Latvia. It flows first in a southwest, and then in a westerly direction. It begins to flow along the border between Latvia and Lithuania from the village of Vegeriai.

The average river slope is 73 cm/km.

References

External links

International rivers of Europe
Border rivers
Rivers of Latvia
Rivers of Lithuania
Latvia–Lithuania border
Venta River basin